Nigerian vehicle registration plates in current use were introduced in 1992 and revised in 2011. Nigeria and Liberia are the only two African countries that use the North American standard 6 × 12 inches (152 × 300 mm), with Egypt using an approximately similar size of 170 x 350 mm. The international code for Nigeria is "WAN" (West Africa Nigeria).

The license plates are generally white and the number itself is imprinted in blue. In the upper left-hand corner they carry the Flag of Nigeria or the national coat of arms. The state name and slogan is displayed at the top centre of the plate, and the "Federal Republic of Nigeria" is written at the bottom.

The unique plate combination itself is in the format ABC-123DE. The first three letters indicate the Local Government Area in which the vehicle was registered, which are followed by three digits and two letters. The background consists of an outline of a map of Nigeria. Before 2011, the three letters indicating the Local Government Area were at the end, in the format AB123-CDE.

Other types of license plates are also in use. Commercial vehicles are written in red rather than blue, and government plates are in green. Diplomatic plates are purple and green with white lettering. The first two/three digits represent the country the owner of the car represents, followed by two letters and numbers. Instead of the name of the state, they read CORPS DIPLOMATIQUE. Cars of the consular corps have instead the letters CC or CORPS CONSULAIRE.

Cost of new vehicle plate number by FRSC 
List of services related to plate number registration: 

 Number plates service cost
 Vehicle weighing and registration fee
 Change of ownership fee

References

External links

Nigeria
Number plate
Road transport in Nigeria
 Registration plates